India and Jamaica have traditionally experienced cordial and friendly relations as a result of cultural and political connections inherited from British colonisation, such as membership in the Commonwealth of Nations, parliamentary democracy, the English language and cricket.

Both nations are members of the Non-Aligned Movement, and Jamaica supports India's candidacy for permanent membership on a reformed UN Security Council.

Diplomatic missions
India has a High Commission in Kingston, whilst Jamaica has an High Commission in New Delhi.

Trade
According to the Ministry of Commerce of the Government of India, total trade between India and Jamaica was worth just US$23 million in 2009–10, with India accounting for nearly all of the exports to Jamaica.

Indians in Jamaica
People of Indian origin or descent number over 3% of the population of Jamaica. This includes the descendants of indentured labourers brought between 1845 to 1917 and subsequent arrivals of professionals.

Other
Kamala Harris was born to a Jamaican father and Indian mother.

References

 
Bilateral relations of Jamaica
Jamaica
Jamaica
India